Ypsolopha uniformis is a moth of the family Ypsolophidae. It was described by Ivan Nikolayevich Filipjev in 1929 and is known from Buryatia, a republic of Russia.

References

Ypsolophidae
Moths of Asia